The Infiniti QX80 (formerly called the Infiniti QX56 until 2013) is a full-size luxury SUV marketed by Nissan's luxury division Infiniti. The first-generation QX56 was built in the United States, and is based on the first-generation Armada. The second-generation model was released in 2010 as a model produced in Japan, which used the sixth-generation Patrol (later also marketed as the second-generation Armada since 2016) as the base vehicle instead. Since the 2014 model year in 2013, the vehicle was renamed to the QX80 as Infiniti renamed their entire product line under a new nomenclature.

First generation (JA60; 2004) 

The first-generation QX56 (model code JA60) is based on the first-generation Armada, while also sharing the F-Alpha platform with the first-generation Titan. It is the first Infiniti built in the United States. The QX56 was only marketed in the United States, Canada, Russia, Oman, Bahrain, Qatar, UAE, Kuwait and Saudi Arabia. Development on the JA60 QX56 began in early 2000 alongside the WA60 Armada. A final design by Masato Takahashi was reached in early 2001, with an August 2001 design freeze for early 2004 start of production.

The rear door handles were installed on the C-pillar as a Nissan design tradition started with the D21 Pathfinder released in 1985 to visually make it appear like a two-door truck with a camper shell, with conventional door handles on the front doors.
	
The first-generation QX56 was powered by a 5.6-liter VK56DE V8 engine ( at 4,900 rpm and  torque at 3,600 rpm) and a 5-speed automatic transmission with an overdrive. As is common with aluminum blocks, each cylinder in the engine was lined with cast iron. The valvetrain was a DOHC design with four valves per cylinder. Infiniti designed the QX56's throttle responsiveness to correspond to specific drivetrain modes: when the driver selects all-wheel drive, the throttle becomes less sensitive, presumably to allow easier regulation of acceleration when off-road.

It comes in one trim level, with only key options such as: DVD entertainment system, 4WD/2WD, and a bench instead of captain chairs as the second row. Other features which came standard were a ten-speaker Bose system, DVD-based navigation system, leather trim for all seats, dual-climate control, 18-inch chrome alloy wheels, and an adaptive cruise control system. A Precrash system was a unique feature in the market as well.

Since the demise of the Q45 (which was priced above the QX56) after 2006, the QX56 was the most expensive Infiniti sold in North America, and was Infiniti's only full-size vehicle.

In early 2007 for the 2008 model year, the Infiniti QX56 received a minor facelift which included a revised grille, a redesigned interior and new intelligent key system, more standard equipment and standard 20-inch chrome wheels. Introduced at the 2007 North American International Auto Show in January 2007, the facelifted model went on sale in April 2007.

After the 2010 model year, the QX56 and Armada no longer share the same body, as the first-generation Armada continued to be produced in the United States until the 2015 model year, while the second-generation QX56 switched to the body used by the Y62 Patrol.

Second generation (Z62; 2010) 

On 31 March 2010, Infiniti debuted the 2011 QX56 at the New York International Auto Show. No longer sharing a platform with the F-Alpha-based Nissan Armada, the QX56 shares the same body with the Y62 Patrol, which also marked the first time that a Patrol-based vehicle had been sold in North America since 1969.

Development of the Z62 QX56 began in 2006 following the concurrent Y62 Patrol program (since 2003), after Nissan management voted to move QX56 production back to Japan and separate from the Nissan Armada, after the JA60 QX56's production run concluded. By 2007, a styling proposal by Shinya Momokawa and Akihiro Sugita was approved by the board and frozen for production.

Compared to its predecessor, the Z62 QX56 is 1.4 inches longer, 1.1 inches wider. Most of the frame's body mass is made from high-tensile steel, but the QX manages to be more rugged with its body-on-frame concept. Both the front and rear feature independent suspension double wishbone suspensions combined with the new Hydraulic Body Motion Control System. The QX comes standard with 20-inch wheels with 22-inch wheels available. 4WD versions have a four-setting terrain control which include rock, snow, sand and dirt modes. This generation abandoned the disguised rear door handle design that were installed in the C-pillar.

The engine is tied to a seven-speed sequential-shift automatic transmission with an all-new 4WD system.

The QX56's interior design includes a number of the standard and optional luxury features in the 2010 Infiniti M, such as semi-aniline leather seats, tri-zone climate control, a Bose 2-channel, 13-speaker Premium Audio surround sound stereo system with hard drive memory storage, hard-drive based navigation system, an Around View Monitor system, and Infiniti Intuitive Park Assist, a parking assist feature which uses the around view monitor. Curtain Vent, new for this generation, directs air flow from the air conditioning system from above each side window down towards the floor.

The QX also features the updated Infiniti hard drive based navigation system with an eight-inch VGA display. Infiniti keyless SmartAccess with an "Intelligent Remote" key is standard along with 8 airbags including knee airbags for driver and front passenger as well as second-row side torso airbags, the Adaptive Front-lighting System (AFS) is standard, while the Pre-Collision System (PCS) and lane departure warning system are available options.

First facelift (2015) 

In 2013 for the 2014 model year, Infiniti renamed their entire product line, so the QX56 was rebadged as the QX80 in April 2014. Coinciding with the renaming, the QX80 arrived at the New York International Auto Show with a mid-generational refresh, receiving new headlights and taillights with new front and rear fascias, restyled bi-xenon HID projector headlamps with LED daytime running lights, front LED turn signals (located on front bumper with new LED fog lights), new wheel designs (including a new 22-inch forged-aluminum version), three new exterior colors, and a number of interior refinements for the 2015 model year. The new flagship trim level for 2015 is the QX80 Limited which features all the QX80 packages and optional equipment that is available on other QX80 trim levels, while its standard on the new QX80 Limited trim level, standard Intelligent All Wheel Drive (AWD), and restyled LED clear lens taillights instead of the LED red lens taillights, however the QX80 Limited trim level is not available with the second row bench seating which increases the passenger capability from 7 seats to 8 seats. Naoyuki Ohkoshi was responsible for exterior design work on the facelift QX80 in 2012.

As of 2017, the Infiniti QX80 is available in the United States (including all US territories), Canada, Mexico, China (including Macau and Hong Kong), the GCC markets, Russia, Ukraine, Azerbaijan, South Korea, Dominican Republic, Guam, Panama, Australia, Malaysia, Singapore and Vietnam. An RHD version was available in some markets as part of the facelift in late 2014.

In late 2016, the 2017 Armada was released and it switched to the Y62 Patrol body, so the Armada is once again a mechanical twin of the QX80 (formerly QX56) since the 2010 model years.

Second facelift (2018) 

The QX80 Monograph Concept was a design study that previewed a significant second facelift to QX80 for the 2018 model year, launched in December 2017. It retained its 5.6-liter V8 engine and basic architecture. The QX80 Monograph was unveiled at the 2017 New York International Auto Show. The revised QX80 debuted at the Dubai International Motor Show, on 14 November 2017. The facelift has redesigned grille, hood, new LED headlamps, and full LED taillamps with bumper-installed rear turn signal lights.

In 2021 for the 2022 model year, Infiniti updated the QX80 featuring an all-new infotainment system and a 12.3 touchscreen display, replacing the dated two-screen setup. The QX80 also features new climate control switches, wireless charging, Android Auto and Apple CarPlay with navigation standard is included with the QX80 and Infiniti's InTouch connected services. The interior revision is almost identical to the related Armada with its 2021 refresh.

Sales

References

External links 

 Official Infiniti USA site
 Official Infiniti USA QX56 homepage
 https://web.archive.org/web/20080112155523/http://www.infiniti.com/qx/

QX80
Cars introduced in 2004
2010s cars
2020s cars
Full-size sport utility vehicles
Luxury sport utility vehicles
Rear-wheel-drive vehicles
All-wheel-drive vehicles
Flagship vehicles